Tallahatta Springs, once called Lowder Springs, is an unincorporated community in Clarke County, Alabama, United States.  It was once known for its mineral springs at the headwaters of Tallahatta Creek.  A health resort was established here in the middle of the 19th century.  Language scholars believe Tallahatta to be an adaptation of two Choctaw language words: tali (rock) and hata (silver/white), literally "white rock."

Geography

References

Unincorporated communities in Alabama
Unincorporated communities in Clarke County, Alabama
Alabama placenames of Native American origin